

Tournament 

Kisei (Go)
2000 in go